Tuscarora township is a township in Steuben County, New York, United States.  The population was 1,388 at the 2020 census.  The township is named after the Tuscarora tribe.

The Township of Tuscarora is in the southern part of the county, southwest of the city of Corning.

History 

The Tuscarora Township in New York State was formed in 1859 from part of the Town of Addison. It is located in Steuben County.

Tuscarora, New York 14510 is a hamlet south of Mount Morris in Livingston County.

Geography

The south township line is the border of Pennsylvania (Tioga County).

New York State Route 417 crosses the northern part of the township, following Tuscarora Creek.

The Tuscarora Creek crosses the northern part of the township. Elk Creek flows northward and joins Tuscarora Creek, west of South Addison.

Demographics

As of the census of 2010, there were 1,473 people, 558 households, and 412 families residing in the township.  The population density was 37.1 people per square mile (14.3/km2).  There were 558 housing units at an average density of 15.0 per square mile (5.8/km2).  The racial makeup of the township was 98.64% White, 0.14% African American, 0.07% Native American, 0.14% Asian, and 1.00% from two or more races. Hispanic or Latino of any race were 0.50% of the population.

There were 558 households, out of which 37.7% had children under the age of 18 living with them, 52.2% were married couples living together, 13.6% had a female householder with no husband present, and 26.2% were non-families. 16.6% of all households were made up of individuals, and 23.5% had someone living alone who was 65 years of age or older.  The average household size was 2.64 and the average family size was 2.93.

The median income for a household in the township was $31,708, and the median income for a family was $32,054. Males had a median income of $26,094 versus $26,250 for females. The per capita income for the township was $13,906.  About 14.9% of families and 18.1% of the population were below the poverty line, including 23.0% of those under age 18 and 7.4% of those age 65 or over.

Communities and locations in the Town of Tuscarora 
Bear Falls – A waterfall south of South Addison.
Freeman – A hamlet in the north part of the township on County Road 85.
Nichols – A hamlet on County Road 86 near the south township line.
Pinnacle State Park and Golf Course – A state park by the northeast township line.
South Addison – A hamlet on NY-417 at the north township line.
Van Fleet – A hamlet south of Freeman on County Road 85.
Woods Corner – A hamlet south of Freeman on County Road 85 (Addison Hill Road).

References

External links
  Tuscarora Township information
  Tuscarora Township history/links

Towns in Steuben County, New York